William Dunbar "Willie" Attrill (March 1868 – 1939) was the first captain of Standard Athletic Club's football team, leading it become the first French football champion in 1894. He was also a member of the silver medal winning French cricket team at the 1900 Summer Olympics, the only time cricket has featured in the Olympics. In the only game against Great Britain he was dismissed for a duck in both French innings, took two wickets in Great Britain's first innings, and two catches in their second.

He also competed in bicycle and automobile races.

References

External links

Olympic final scorecard

Olympic silver medalists for France
Cricketers at the 1900 Summer Olympics
Olympic cricketers of France
French cricketers
1868 births
1939 deaths
Medalists at the 1900 Summer Olympics
Date of birth missing
Date of death missing